Peter John Gardner (5 January 1925 – 15 February 1996) was an Australian hurdler who competed in the 1948 Summer Olympics.

References

External links 
 
 
 
 

1925 births
1996 deaths
Australian male hurdlers
Olympic athletes of Australia
Athletes (track and field) at the 1948 Summer Olympics
Commonwealth Games gold medallists for Australia
Commonwealth Games medallists in athletics
Athletes (track and field) at the 1950 British Empire Games
20th-century Australian people
People from Glen Huntly, Victoria
Athletes from Melbourne
Sportsmen from Victoria (Australia)
Medallists at the 1950 British Empire Games